Robert Lebel (8 November 1924 – 25 May 2015) was a Canadian Catholic bishop.

Born in Trois-Pistoles, Quebec, Canada, Lebel was ordained to the priesthood in 1950 and was appointed titular bishop of Alinda and auxiliary bishop of the Roman Catholic Diocese of Saint-Jean-Longueuil in 1974. In 1976, he was appointed bishop of the Roman Catholic Diocese of Valleyfield and retired in 2000. On 20 May 2015, he died in the Mallersdorf Abbey in Bavaria.

References

1924 births
2015 deaths
20th-century Roman Catholic bishops in Canada
Roman Catholic bishops of Saint-Jean-Longueuil
Roman Catholic bishops of Valleyfield
Canadian expatriates in Germany